The 1719 Establishment Group of sixth rates defined the 20-gun sixth rate using the Dursley Galley as a model. This design works and sailed well. Seventeen ships would be rebuilds of earlier vessels, some would be fifth rates, a couple of fireships and three vessels of new construction with the majority rebuilt from older sixth rate vessels. These ships would be constructed between 1722 and 1727.

Design and specifications
The construction of the vessels was assigned to Royal dockyards. As with most vessels of this time period only order and launch dates are available. The dimensional data listed here is the specification data and the acceptable design creep will be listed on each individual vessel. The tonnage calculation would be 375 tons.

The gun armament as established in 1703 would be twenty 6-pounder 19 hundredweight (cwt) guns mounted on wooden trucks on the upper deck (UD).

Ships of the 1719 Establishment Group

Citations

References
 Winfield 2009, British Warships in the Age of Sail (1603 – 1714), by Rif Winfield, published by Seaforth Publishing, England © 2009, EPUB , Chapter 6, The Sixth Rates, Vessels acquired from 2 May 1660, Gibraltar Group
 Winfield 2007, British Warships in the Age of Sail (1714 – 1792), by Rif Winfield, published by Seaforth Publishing, England © 2007, EPUB , Chapter 6, Sixth Rates, Sixth Rates of 20 or 24 guns, Vessels in Service at 1 August 1714, Gibraltar Group
 Colledge, Ships of the Royal Navy, by J.J. Colledge, revised and updated by Lt Cdr Ben Warlow and Steve Bush, published by Seaforth Publishing, Barnsley, Great Britain, © 2020, EPUB 

 

Corvettes of the Royal Navy
Ships of the Royal Navy